"C'est la nuit" is a single from Khaled's album Kenza.

Track listings

Version 1 
"C'est la nuit" - 4:07
"Leili" - 4:07

Version 2 
"C'est la nuit" - 4:07
"Aâlach tloumouni" - 5:02
"La liberté (unreleased)" - 6:09
"Leili" - 4:07

1999 singles
French-language songs
Khaled (musician) songs
1999 songs
Barclay (record label) singles